Lioon is a genus of pill beetles in the family Byrrhidae. There are at least four described species in Lioon.

Species
These four species belong to the genus Lioon:
 Lioon nezperce Johnson, 1991
 Lioon puncticeps Casey
 Lioon simplicipes (Mannerheim, 1852)
 Lioon speculare Casey

References

Further reading

 
 
 

Byrrhidae
Articles created by Qbugbot